The 2015 Winnipeg Blue Bombers season was the 58th season for the team in the Canadian Football League and their 83rd overall. The Blue Bombers finished the season in 4th place in the West Division with a 5–13 record and missed the playoffs for the fourth year in a row, as well as the sixth time in seven seasons. This was also the first time since 2010 that a Grey Cup host city has failed to qualify for the playoffs.

Offseason

CFL draft
The 2015 CFL Draft took place on May 12, 2015. The Blue Bombers had six selections in the seven-round draft, including three of the first 15 picks. The team traded their third-round pick for Saskatchewan's second after sending Cory Watson and receiving Kris Bastien. The team also lost their seventh-round pick after trading for Josh Portis.

Preseason

Regular season

Standings

Schedule

Team

Roster

Coaching staff

References

Winnipeg Blue Bombers seasons
2015 Canadian Football League season by team